Maxim Nys (born 28 October 1996) is a Belgian footballer who plays for Dender EH.

References

Belgian footballers
Belgian Pro League players
1996 births
Living people
S.K. Beveren players
F.C.V. Dender E.H. players
Association football fullbacks